General Freeman may refer to:

Carl H. Freeman (born 1947), U.S. Army major general
Nathaniel Freeman (physician) (1741–1827), Massachusetts Militia brigadier general in the American Revolutionary War
Paul L. Freeman Jr. (1907–1988), U.S. Army four-star general

See also
Harold Freeman-Attwood (1897–1963), British Army major general